Joseph Ridgway (May 6, 1783 – February 1, 1861) was a U.S. Representative from Ohio.

Born in Staten Island, New York, Ridgway attended the public schools.
Learned the trade of carpenter.
He moved to Cayuga County, New York, in 1811 and engaged in the manufacture of plows.
He settled in Columbus, Ohio, in 1822 and established an iron foundry.
He served as member of the State house of representatives 1828–1832.

Ridgway was elected as a Whig to the Twenty-fifth, Twenty-sixth, and Twenty-seventh Congresses (March 4, 1837 – March 3, 1843).
He was an unsuccessful candidate for reelection in 1842 to the Twenty-eighth Congress.
He served as member of the State board of equalization.
He served as director of the Clinton Bank for twenty years.
He served as member of the city council.
He died in Columbus, Ohio, February 1, 1861.
He was interred in Green Lawn Cemetery.

Sources

1783 births
1861 deaths
People from Staten Island
Politicians from Columbus, Ohio
Columbus City Council members
Members of the Ohio House of Representatives
Burials at Green Lawn Cemetery (Columbus, Ohio)
Whig Party members of the United States House of Representatives from Ohio
19th-century American politicians